Winrich Behr (22 January 1918 – 25 April 2011) was a German officer during World War II. He was on the intelligence staff of the Sixth Army during the Stalingrad encirclement. Behr had served Friedrich Paulus, Erwin Rommel, Gunther von Kluge, Walter Model. He was the witness of Model's last hours in Ruhr Pocket.

In January 1943 he was sent by Paulus to try to convince Hitler of the hopelessness of winning the war on the Eastern Front; this mission did not succeed.

After the war, Behr began studying at the University of Bonn. He served as the assistant general secretary of the Europäische Wirtschaftsgemeinschaft (EWG, or European Economic Union) Commission in Brussels.

A decade after the war, Winrich Behr sought out the burial site of the Field Marshal Walter Model in the isolated woods south of Duisburg, together with Hansgeorg Model, the field marshal's son.

Awards

 Knight's Cross of the Iron Cross on 15 May 1941 as Oberleutnant and chief of the 3./Aufklärungs-Abteilung 3 in the DAK

References

Citations

Bibliography

External links
 
 "Den Mann kannst du abschreiben", interview Der Spiegel Nr. 51, 2002
 Interview with Winrich Behr at the Historical Archives of the EU in Florence

1918 births
2011 deaths
Military personnel from Berlin
Officers Crosses of the Order of Merit of the Federal Republic of Germany
People from the Province of Brandenburg
Recipients of the Iron Cross (1939), 1st class
Recipients of the Knight's Cross of the Iron Cross